Bishnupur Rural Municipality may refer to:

Bishnupur Rural Municipality, Saptari, Nepal
Bishnupur Rural Municipality, Siraha, Nepa

See also
Bishnupur (disambiguation)